Ethiopian Australians are immigrants from Ethiopia to Australia and their descendants. However, as Ethiopia is a multi-ethnic country with significant inter-ethnic tensions, not all individuals from Ethiopia accept the label "Ethiopian", instead preferring to identify by their ethnic group. In particular, various Oromo people use the term 'Oromo Australian' instead. In contrast, there are many individuals who prefer to label themselves as Ethiopian Australians. This is because they oppose labelling themselves based on their ethnicity as they see it as divisive and politicising their ethnic identity. This is common among the Amharic-speaking community along with ethnically mixed individuals, compared to others who stand by their ethnic identity.

Migration history
Ethiopian refugees who would eventually settle in Australia began flowing out of their home country as early as the 1970s, when the Derg came to power. They lived in refugee camps in neighbouring countries, mainly Sudan and Kenya, some for as long as 20 years before they found a country willing to resettle them. More left as refugees after Eritrea gained independence in 1993. The United States, rather than Australia, was the first-choice destination for most refugees; as a result, the Ethiopians in Australia tend to have less educational background and occupational skills than Ethiopian populations who relocated elsewhere.

Late in the following year, 350 more Ethiopians from the Abu Rakham camp in Sudan, largely single or widowed mothers and their families, were resettled in Australia. These were mostly Christians of Amhara and Tigray descent.

Numbers and distribution
According to the 2006 Australian census 5,633 Australians were born in Ethiopia while 5,600 claimed Ethiopian ancestry, either alone or with another ancestry. The similar figures for ancestry and place of birth are indicative of the very recent immigration of this group.

Australia's 2001 census found about 3,600 residents of the country who reported their place of birth as Ethiopia. This made them the 15th-largest group of Ethiopian-born people in a country outside of Ethiopia, ahead of the United Arab Emirates and behind Norway. About 85% of those lived in Melbourne, alongside communities of immigrants from other countries in the Horn of Africa, mainly Eritrea and Somalia; they are primarily settled in Footscray and neighbouring suburbs such as Ascot Vale, Braybrook, Flemington, Kensington, and Sunshine. Other communities of Ethiopians can be found in New South Wales and Tasmania.

Education and employment
According to the 2011 Census, 51.3 per cent of Ethiopia-born Australians 15 years and over in age had some form of higher non-school qualifications. 19.7 per cent of the Ethiopia-born aged 15 years and over were still attending an educational institution.

Ethiopia-born individuals in Australia aged 15 years and over participated in the labour force at a rate of 62.3 per cent; the unemployment rate was 15 per cent. Of the 3,775 Ethiopia-born immigrants who were employed, 26.2 per cent worked in a professional, skilled managerial or trade occupation. In Footscray, some have set up ethnic-oriented businesses, such as hair salons, clothing shops, and restaurants with a mostly Ethiopian customer base.

Religion
Religious divisions among migrants from Ethiopia follow ethnic lines. The Amhara and Tigray are largely members of the Ethiopian Orthodox Tewahedo Church while the Gurage are almost evenly divided between members of the Ethiopian Orthodox Tewahedo Church and followers of Islam. Most Oromo are Muslim or members of the Ethiopian Orthodox Tewahedo Church or various Pentecostal churches, and the Harari and Afar are almost all Muslims. There were two Ethiopian Pentecostal churches in the Melbourne area as of 2001, as well as an Ethiopian Orthodox church in Maribyrnong. However, there were no mosques specifically devoted to Muslims from Ethiopia; instead, they worship alongside believers from other countries.

Notable people
Kamal Ibrahim, footballer
Mizan Mehari, long-distance runner
Abebe Fekadu, powerlifter
Bendere Oboya, sprinter
Sunday Aryang, netballer

References

Sources

. Total count of persons: 19,855,288.
. Total responses: 25,451,383 for total count of persons: 19,855,288.

Further reading

External links
Ethiopian Community Association in NSW
Ethiopian Culture by SBS Cultural Atlas

+
Ethnic groups in Australia
African Australian
Australia